The Line 2 of Hefei Metro is an underground metro line in Hefei. The line was opened on December 26, 2017.

Opening timeline

Stations

References

02
2017 establishments in China
Railway lines opened in 2017